Robert Joseph Baker (born June 4, 1944, in Willard, Ohio) is an American prelate of the Roman Catholic Church.  He served as bishop of the Diocese of Birmingham in Alabama from 2007 to 2019 and as bishop of the Diocese of Charleston in South Carolina from 1999 to 2007

Baker became a member of the Ancient Order of Hibernians in 2008 and became the State AOH chaplain in Alabama. He has written several books.

Biography

Early life 
Born on June 4, 1944, in Willard, Ohio, Robert Baker entered the Pontifical College Josephinum in Columbus, Ohio, in 1966.  He graduated with a Bachelor of Philosophy degree.

Priesthood 
On March 21, 1970, Baker was ordained into the priesthood by Bishop Paul Tanner for the Diocese of St. Augustine. After his ordination, Baker was assigned as assistant pastor of St. Paul Parish in Jacksonville Beach, Florida. In 1972, Baker went to Rome to study at the Pontifical Gregorian University, where in 1975 he received a Licentiate of Sacred Theology in dogmatic theology.

In 1976, Baker was appointed director of the Catholic Student Parish at the University of Florida and assigned as pastor of the Cathedral-Basilica of St. Augustine Parish in St. Augustine, Florida. In 1977, he was granted the Doctor of Theology degree. Baker was appointed in 1981 as instructor of sacramental theology at St. Vincent de Paul Seminary in Boynton Beach, Florida. In 1984, he became the pastor of the Cathedral-Basilica Parish of St. Augustine and in 1997 was transferred to Christ the King Parish in Jacksonville.

Bishop of Charleston
On July 12, 1999, Pope John Paul II appointed Baker as bishop of the Diocese of Charleston.  He was consecrated on September 28, 1999, by Archbishop John Donoghue at the Convention and Performing Arts Center in North Charleston, South Carolina. During his tenure as bishop, Baker dedicated new or expanded churches, schools, and parish facilities.

On January 26, 2007, the Diocese of Charleston reached a $5 million minimum settlement with sexual abuse victims and their family members. Baker said that he deeply regretted the anguish suffered by them.

Bishop of Birmingham
On August 14, 2007, Pope Benedict XVI appointed baker as the bishop of the Diocese of Birmingham. He was installed as bishop on October 2, 2007. On March 25, 2020, Pope Francis accepted his resignation as bishop of Birmingham.

Positions 
Baker was critical in 2009 of the honorary doctorate that Notre Dame University granted to President Barack Obama, since Obama supported abortion rights for women. Baker suggested that Catholics assemble and pray on the day Obama was to receive his degree; he discouraged public demonstrations, however.

In a 2020 interview with the Catholic World Report, Baker gave his opinion on the cause of the sexual abuse scandals in the Catholic Church:I agree with Pope Benedict XVI that the origins of the scandals we’re experiencing are related to the changing sexual mores in society that we really began to see in the 1960s. The 1969 music festival at Woodstock, New York symbolized the change in American culture.  Moral values in our country, and in the Western hemisphere, had changed. The drug culture came with it.

Bibliography
 When Did We See You, Lord? Baker, Robert J. and Groeschel, C.F.R., Benedict J., Our Sunday Visitor, Inc. (Huntington, Indiana), 2005.

See also
 

 Catholic Church hierarchy
 Catholic Church in the United States
 Historical list of the Catholic bishops of the United States
 List of Catholic bishops of the United States
 Lists of patriarchs, archbishops, and bishops

References

External links
 Diocese of Birmingham in Alabama Website

Episcopal succession

1944 births
Living people
20th-century Roman Catholic bishops in the United States
21st-century Roman Catholic bishops in the United States
Roman Catholic bishops of Charleston
Roman Catholic Diocese of Birmingham in Alabama
Bishops in Alabama
People from Willard, Ohio
Catholics from Ohio